The Utah Supreme Court is the supreme court of the state of Utah, United States. It has final authority of interpretation of the Utah Constitution.  The Utah Supreme Court is composed of five members: a chief justice, an associate chief justice, and three justices.  All justices are appointed by the governor of Utah, with confirmation by the Utah Senate. The five justices elect one of their own to serve as chief justice and another to serve as associate chief justice, each for a term of four years.

History 
Before present-day Utah became a state, it was organized into a provisional state, called the State of Deseret. Its constitution established a three-member supreme court. In 1850, the United States Congress passed "An Act to Establish a Territorial Government for Utah", Section 9 of which provided that "the judicial power of said territory shall be vested in a Supreme Court, District Court, and Justices of the Peace". This act converted Deseret's supreme court into a territorial supreme court with expanded jurisdiction.

In 1894, the United States Congress passed an Enabling Act, which called a convention to draft a constitution for Utah, another step towards statehood. The Enabling Act provided that Utah's territorial courts would be succeeded by new state courts with the same structure and jurisdiction. When Utah became a state on January 4, 1896, its constitution took effect, and Utah's territorial supreme court was replaced by a new state supreme court. The constitution provided that the court would have three members, but that the Utah Legislature could expand its membership to five after 1905, an option it ultimately exercised.

In 1998, the Utah Supreme Court moved into the Scott M. Matheson courthouse. The multimillion-dollar building was nicknamed the "Taj Mahal" by some critics over its cost. Prior to that, the court met in the Utah State Capitol.

Supreme Court justices

The Governor of Utah nominates justices from a list created by a judicial nominating commission each time a vacancy arises. The nominee must then be confirmed by a majority of the Utah Senate to take office. If confirmed, the justice is subjected to a nonpartisan, "unopposed retention election at the first general election held more than three years after appointment" and every ten years thereafter.

References

External links 

 
 

 
1894 establishments in Utah Territory
Courts and tribunals established in 1894